Monthois is a commune in the Ardennes department in northern France.

Population

Monuments 

Monthois features a monument built to recognize the 372nd Infantry of the 93rd American Division, who fought a battle in the town in early October 1918.

See also
Communes of the Ardennes department

References

Communes of Ardennes (department)
Ardennes communes articles needing translation from French Wikipedia